Marat Fyaridyevich Mustafin (born 25 May 1971) is a Russian football manager and a former player.

In 2000 and 2001 he worked as a referee.

References

1971 births
Living people
Soviet footballers
Association football midfielders
FC Mordovia Saransk players
Russian footballers
Russian football referees
Russian football managers
FC Mordovia Saransk managers
Russian Premier League managers